Sir John Vivian Dacie, FRS (20 July 1912 Putney, London – 12 February 2005) was a British haematologist.

Education 
He was born in Putney, London and educated at King's College School, Wimbledon, after which he studied medicine at King's College Hospital Medical School, qualifying in 1936.

Career 
He had house jobs at King's College Hospital, the Royal Postgraduate Medical School, London University, Hammersmith and a research post at Manchester Royal Infirmary. During World War II (1943–1946) he served in the Royal Army Medical Corps, ending up a lieutenant colonel. After the war he was a Senior Lecturer and then in 1956 Professor at the Royal Postgraduate Medical School. 

He founded the Leukaemia Research Fund, Great Ormond Street, London (1960). His main achievements concerned the Hemolytic anemias, a field in which he was a world leader. He discovered and named Christmas disease, more commonly referred to as haemophilia B, a deficiency of coagulation Factor IX.

Sir Dacie is credited with characterizing the relationship between paroxysmal nocturnal hemoglobinuria and bone marrow failure syndromes like aplastic anemia.

He was founder of the Leukaemia Research Unit, Hammersmith Hospital (1969) and founder and editor of the British Journal of Haematology. He was elected President of the Royal College of Pathologists (1973–1975) and the Royal Society of Medicine (1977).

He had a lifelong interest in lepidoptera. He was knighted in 1976 and retired in 1977.

Family 
Dacie married Margaret Thynne in 1938.

Works
Practical Haematology. Churchill, 1950

References

1912 births
2005 deaths
People from Putney
People educated at King's College School, London
20th-century English medical doctors
Royal Army Medical Corps officers
British haematologists
Presidents of the Royal Society of Medicine
Fellows of the Royal Society
Knights Bachelor